Pingshui Rhyming Scheme is a rhyming system of the Middle Chinese language. Compiled in the Jin Dynasty, Pingshui Yun is one of the most popular rhyming system in Chinese poetry after Tang Dynasty and the official standard in later dynasties.

History
Pingshui Yun possibly originated as an abridged version of the rhyme dictionary Guangyun, whose 206-rhyme system was criticized for being overly restrictive. The system was traditionally attributed to Song Dynasty scholar Liu Yuan (劉淵), whose 1252 work Renzi Xinkan Libu Yunlüe (壬子新刊禮部韻略) divided common Chinese characters in poetry into 107 rhyme categories. However, in 1223, Xinkan Yunlüe (新刊韻略) was already published by Wang Wenyu (王文鬱) of Jin Dynasty. The latter's contents was almost identical to Renzi Xinkan Libu Yunlüe, with the only difference being that Liu's book splits the rhyme category 迥 into two. A book unearthed from Mogao Caves named Paizi Yun (排字韻) implies that the system was already widely circulated at the time.

Both works have since been lost. In Yuan Dynasty, Yunfu Qunyu by Yin Shifu (陰時夫) first named the 106-category version as Pingshui Yun. Origin of the name "Pingshui" is unclear. Traditionally, it is believed that Pingshui refers to Liu Yuan's hometown in modern Linfen, Shanxi. Alternatively, "Pingshui" may refer to a government post in charge of tax for fishing.

In Yuan, Ming and Qing dynasties, Pingshui Yun system was highly influential as the Yunfu Qunyu version served as the official standard in the Imperial Examinations. Although modern Chinese phonology has become significantly different from Middle Chinese, the system is still being used by some poets today.

Rhyme Categories
The following chart lists all 106 rhyme groups of the Pingshui Yun system and the modern Standard Mandarin pronunciation of the representative characters.

References

External links
Pingshui Rhyme Categories in Chinese Text Project.

Traditional Chinese phonology
Middle Chinese
Poetry in Classical Chinese
Chinese dictionaries